This 2012–13 season in League One was Crewe's 89th competitive season in the English Football League and first upon return to League One after an absence spanning over three seasons.

Season key events
27 May 2012: Goals from Nick Powell and Byron Moore secure a 2–0 win over Cheltenham Town in the 2011-12 Football League Two play-off final at Wembley.
1 June 2012: The club announce that they will be releasing David Artell, Lee Bell, Carl Martin, Danny Shelley, Jordan Brown, Jason Oswell, Caspar Hughes, Michael Koral, Danny Ting and Jordan Connerton.
4 June 2012: The club announce that youngster Paris Bateman has signed his first professional contract after graduating from the famed Crewe Academy.
6 June 2012: It is announced that Harry Clayton has re-signed on a new one-year deal.
8 June 2012: The club announces that Andy White has also re-signed a new one-year deal.
13 June 2012: Crewe announce that Nick Powell has signed a four-year contract with Manchester United for £4m.
14 June 2012: The club announces the re-signing of Ollie Turton, on a new one-year contract.
28 June 2012: Crewe announce the signing of Torquay defender Mark Ellis for an undisclosed fee.
3 July 2012: Goalkeeper Steve Phillips re-signs at the club on a new two-year deal, which involves him acting as the academy's goal-keeping coach. Also, the club announces the signing of defender Gregor Robertson on a two-year contract after he was released by Chesterfield at the end of the 2011–12 season.
6 July 2012: Crewe announce the signing of Mathias Pogba from Conference National side Wrexham.
9 July 2012: Goalkeeper Alan Martin re-signs with the club on a new six-month deal.
10 July 2012: The signing of Ebbsfleet United winger Michael West is announced for a nominal compensation package.
14 July 2012: Crewe announce that striker Byron Moore has re-signed on a two-year deal.
16 July 2012: The club announces the re-signing of defender Kelvin Mellor on a new two-year deal.
25 July 2012: The club announce the signing of midfielder Abdul Osman on a free transfer and a two-year contract.
30 July 2012: The club announces the departure of striker Shaun Miller on a two-year deal to Sheffield United for an undisclosed fee.
11 August 2012: The season proper kicks off with a 5 – 0 victory over Hartlepool United in the First Round of the Football League Cup.
13 August 2012: The re-signing of defender Adam Dugdale on a three-year deal is announced by the club.
18 August 2012: The league campaign starts with a loss to Notts County; the club's first loss in twenty competitive matches.
21 August 2012: Striker Harry Bunn joins the club from Manchester City on a six-month loan deal. Crewe beat Scunthorpe United 2–1 for their first win of the league campaign.
28 August 2012: Crewe are knocked out of the Football League Cup in the second round with a 2 – 0 loss away to West Ham United.
31 August 2012: Club captain Ashley Westwood is signed by Aston Villa for an undisclosed fee on a four-year deal.
7 September 2012: Midfielder Chuks Aneke becomes Crewe's second loanee of the season signing an initial one month contract from Arsenal.
7 April 2013: Crewe are crowned champions of the Football League Trophy thanks to goals from Luke Murphy and Max Clayton.

Results

Pre-season

League One

League Cup

Football League Trophy

FA Cup

League table

Squad

First team squad

Players' ages as of 27 April 2013

Squad statistics

Appearances

Appearances formatted as starts + substitutions.

|-
|colspan="14"|Players that have played for Crewe Alexandra this season that have left the club or are currently out on loan:

|}

Goalscorers

  Players highlighted in light grey denote the player had scored for the club before leaving for another club
  Players highlighted in light cyan denote the player has scored for the club after arriving at Crewe during the season
  Players highlighted in Blonde denote the player has scored for the club before leaving the club on loan for part/the rest of the season

Disciplinary record

  Players highlighted in light grey denote the player has received a yellow/red card for the club before leaving for another club
  Players highlighted in light cyan denote the player has received a yellow/red card for the club after arriving at Crewe during the season
  Players highlighted in Blonde denote the player has received a yellow/red card for the club before leaving the club on loan for part/the rest of the season

Notes

Transfers

Summer

In

Out

References

External links
 Crewe Alexandra F.C. Official Website

Crewe Alexandra F.C. seasons
Crewe Alexandra